In observational astronomy, culmination is the passage of a celestial object (such as the Sun, the Moon, a planet, a star, constellation or a deep-sky object) across the observer's local meridian.  These events were also known as meridian transits, used in timekeeping and navigation, and measured precisely using a transit telescope.

During each day, every celestial object appears to move along a circular path on the celestial sphere due to the Earth's rotation creating two moments when it crosses the meridian.  Except at the geographic poles, any celestial object passing through the meridian has an upper culmination, when it reaches its highest point (the moment when it is nearest to the Zenith), and nearly twelve hours later, is followed by a lower culmination, when it reaches its lowest point (nearest to the Nadir). The time of culmination (when the object culminates) is often used to mean upper culmination.

An object's altitude (A) in degrees at its upper culmination is equal to 90 minus the observer's latitude (L) plus the object's declination (δ): .

Cases
Three cases are dependent on the observer's latitude (L) and the declination (δ) of the celestial object:
The object is above the horizon even at its lower culmination; i.e. if  (i.e. if in absolute value the declination is more than the colatitude, in the corresponding hemisphere)
The object is below the horizon even at its upper culmination; i.e. if  (i.e. if in absolute value the declination is more than the colatitude, in the opposite hemisphere)
The upper culmination is above and the lower below the horizon, so the body is observed to rise and set daily; in the other cases (i.e. if in absolute value the declination is less than the colatitude)

The third case applies for objects in a part of the full sky equal to the cosine of the latitude (at the equator it applies for all objects, because the sky turns around the horizontal north–south line; at the poles it applies for none, because the sky turns around the vertical line). The first and second case each apply for half of the remaining sky.

Period of time

The period between one upper culmination and the next is about 24 hours, while the period between an upper one and a lower one is almost 12 hours. The orbital motion, Earth's rotation and proper motion of Earth affect the period between successive upper culminations. Due to the proper and improper motions of the Sun, one solar day (the interval between like culminations of the Sun) is slightly longer than one sidereal day (the interval between like culminations of any reference star).

The Sun

From the tropics and middle latitudes, the Sun is visible in the sky at its upper culmination (at solar noon) and invisible (below the horizon) at its lower culmination (at solar midnight). When viewed from the region within either polar circle around the winter solstice of that hemisphere (the December solstice in the Arctic and the June solstice in the Antarctic), the Sun is below the horizon at both of its culminations.

Supposing that the declination of the Sun is +20° when it crosses the local meridian, then the complementary angle of 70° (from the Sun to the pole) is added to and subtracted from the observer's latitude to find the solar altitudes at upper and lower culminations, respectively.
From 52° north, the upper culmination is at 58° above the horizon due south, while the lower is at 18° below the horizon due north. This is calculated as 52° + 70° = 122° (the supplementary angle being 58°) for the upper, and 52° − 70° = −18° for the lower.
From 80° north, the upper culmination is at 30° above the horizon due south, while the lower is at 10° above the horizon (midnight sun) due north.

Circumpolar stars

From most of the Northern Hemisphere, Polaris (the North Star) and the other stars of the constellation Ursa Minor circles counterclockwise around the north celestial pole and remain visible at both culminations (as long as the sky is clear and dark enough). In the Southern Hemisphere there is no bright pole star, but the constellation Octans circles clockwise around the south celestial pole and remains visible at both culminations.

Any astronomical objects that always remain above the local horizon, as viewed from the observer's latitude, are described as circumpolar.

See also
Celestial sphere
Meridian (astronomy)
Nadir
Satellite pass
Zenith

References

Celestial mechanics
Spherical astronomy